was a Japanese samurai of the late Edo period who was a retainer of the Aizu domain.

Life 
Kajiwara served as a karō (house elder) in the Aizu administration, and supervised political affairs during the Boshin War, also attending to matters of arms procurement. After the war, he went to Nemuro, and died there. His grave in Nemuro was discovered in 1988.

Genealogy 
Kajiwara claimed descent from the Kamakura period warrior Kajiwara Kagetoki.

References

Tsunabuchi Kenjo (1984). Matsudaira Katamori no subete. Tokyo: Shin Jinbutsu Ōraisha.
Nakamura Akihiko (2006). Byakkotai.
Hoshi Ryōichi (2005). Onnatachi no Aizusensō.
https://www.city.nemuro.hokkaido.jp/lifeinfo/kakuka/kyoikuiinkai/kyoikushiryokan/siryoukann/shisekihyochu/6720.html

Samurai
1842 births
1889 deaths
People from Aizu
Karō
People of the Boshin War
Aizu-Matsudaira retainers